Charlotte Mineau (March 24, 1886 – October 12, 1979) was a tall and thin American film actress of the silent era appearing in 65 to 80 films.

Biography
Mineau appeared in 65 films between 1913 and 1931. She supported Charlie Chaplin on numerous occasions, and also appeared in several very early Laurel and Hardy comedies.

One of her last screen appearances was with the Marx Brothers and Thelma Todd in Monkey Business (1931)  where she appears  as "Emily", a woman overheard by Groucho having an illicit affair on the veranda during the party scene. Her last known film appearance was in the Hal Roach two-reeler, Strictly Unreliable (1932), again with Thelma Todd and ZaSu Pitts, in which Mineau, credited as "Charlotte Meno", plays Todd's landlady, Mrs. Hawkins.

Mineau was born in Michigan and died in Los Angeles, California.

Partial filmography

 Two Hearts That Beat as Ten (1915, Short) - The Nurse
 His New Job (1915, Short) - Film Star (uncredited)
 Sweedie Goes to College (1915, Short) - Mrs. Knowledge - the Matron
 A Bunch of Keys (1915) - Rose Keys
 A Night in the Show (1915, Short) - Lady in the Stalls (uncredited)
 The Floorwalker (1916, Short) - Store Detective
 The Vagabond (1916, Short) - Girl's mother
 The Count (1916, Short) - Mrs. Moneybags (uncredited)
 The Pawnshop (1916, Short) - Customer (uncredited)
 The Rink (1916, Short) - Edna's Friend (uncredited)
 Easy Street (1917, Short) - Big Eric's Wife (uncredited)
 Rosemary Climbs the Heights (1918) - Mme. Thamar Fedoreska
 Carolyn of the Corners (1919) - Amanda Parlow
 Married Life (1920) - Impatient Patient
 Love, Honor and Behave (1920) - A Merry Widow
 Love Is an Awful Thing (1922) - Marion
 The Extra Girl (1923) - Belle Brown
 Happiness (1924) - Head Saleslady
 Baby Clothes (1926, Short) - Mrs. Weedle
 Sparrows (1926) - Mrs. Grimes
 Get 'Em Young (1926, Short) - Hired bride
 45 Minutes from Hollywood (1926, Short) - Orville's Mother
 Love 'em and Weep (1927, Short) - Mrs. Aggie Tillsbury
 The First Auto (1927) - Mrs. Stebbins (uncredited)
 Sugar Daddies (1927, Short) - Mrs. Brittle
 Monkey Business (1931)
 Beach Pajamas (1931, Short)
 Strictly Unreliable (1932, Short) - Mrs. Hawkins - Landlady

References

External links

1886 births
1979 deaths
American film actresses
American silent film actresses
Actresses from Michigan
20th-century American actresses